Rockbird is the second solo studio album by American singer Debbie Harry. It was released in November 1986 by Geffen Records in the United States and Chrysalis Records in the United Kingdom.

Background
Rockbird was released four years after the split of Blondie in 1982. Harry had largely put her music career on hold during the mid-1980s in order to look after Blondie guitarist and boyfriend Chris Stein, who had been diagnosed with a serious illness. The album was produced by Seth Justman, a key member of the J. Geils Band. Released in November 1986, there were four variations of the album artwork with the lettering in either green, orange, pink and yellow (with slight variations due to printing techniques).

A stylized version of the album's cover photo appears on the cover of select editions of the book 1001 Albums You Must Hear Before You Die.

Critical reception
Trouser Press wrote that the album "paves a pop path Harry can navigate, but the material is weak." The Los Angeles Times wrote that "the songs--which tend to be about ne’er-do-well boyfriends and romantic escapades--are tethered to jacked-up rhythms that don’t go down so well on the dance floor." Chris Heath of Smash Hits magazine was more positive, giving the album 7 out of 10 and stating "Nothing else is quite as brilliant as the current single "French Kissin' In The USA", but there's plenty of the aggressive sprightly pop songs that Blondie used to do so well, the odd slightly swoonsome ballad, and a couple of throwaway disco songs. How very nice it is to have her back".

Commercial performance
Rockbird peaked at number 31 on the UK Albums Chart, and remained in the charts for 11 weeks. It was certified gold by the British Phonographic Industry (BPI) in January 1987 for shipments in excess of 100,000 copies. In the United States, the album peaked at number 97 on the Billboard 200.

Three singles were released from the album, "French Kissin' in the USA", which reached #8 in the UK, and is Harry's only solo top-10 single in that country, as well as "In Love With Love" and "Free to Fall", which reached #45 and #46, respectively. "French Kissin'" also reached #57 on the US Billboard Hot 100, and #3 in Australia.

Track listing
Side A:
 "I Want You" (Deborah Harry, Toni C.) – 4:28
 "French Kissin' in the USA" (Chuck Lorre) – 5:14
 "Buckle Up" (Deborah Harry, Seth Justman) – 3:46
 "In Love with Love" (Deborah Harry, Chris Stein) – 4:34
Side B:
 "You Got Me in Trouble" (Deborah Harry, Seth Justman) – 4:18
 "Free to Fall" (Deborah Harry, Seth Justman) – 5:31
 "Rockbird" (Deborah Harry, Chris Stein) – 3:09
 "Secret Life" (Deborah Harry, Chris Stein) – 3:46
 "Beyond the Limit" (Deborah Harry, Nile Rodgers) – 4:37

Personnel
 Deborah Harry – lead vocals, backing vocals on all tracks except "French Kissin'"
 Jimmy Rip – guitar on all tracks
 Toni C. (Antoinette Colandero) – additional guitar on "I Want You"
 Phil Ashley – drum and bass programming and keyboards on "I Want You", "French Kissin'", "In Love with Love", "Rockbird" and "Secret Life", keyboards on "You Got Me in Trouble" and "Free to Fall"
 Seth Justman – drum and bass programming and keyboards on "I Want You", "French Kissin'", "In Love with Love", "Rockbird" and "Secret Life", keyboards on "Buckle Up", "You Got Me in Trouble", "Free to Fall" and "Beyond the Limit", backing vocals on all tracks except "French Kissin'"
 Magic Dick – harmonica "I Want You"
 James White – saxophone solo on "I Want You"
 Jocelyn Brown – backing vocals on "I Want You", "French Kissin'", "You Got Me in Trouble" and "Free to Fall"
 Connie Harvey – backing vocals on "I Want You", "French Kissin'", "You Got Me in Trouble" and "Free to Fall"
 La-Rita Gaskins – backing vocals on "I Want You", "French Kissin'", "You Got Me in Trouble" and "Free to Fall"
 Crispin Cioe – alto saxophone, baritone saxophone; solo on "French Kissin'"
 Gordon Gottlieb – percussion on "French Kissin'", "Buckle Up", "In Love with Love", "Secret Life" and "Beyond the Limit"
 Neil Jason – bass on "Buckle Up", "You Got Me in Trouble", "Free to Fall", "Secret Life" and "Beyond the Limit"
 Yogi Horton – drums on "Buckle Up", "You Got Me in Trouble", "Free to Fall" and "Beyond the Limit"
 The Uptown Horns – on "Buckle Up", "You Got Me in Trouble" and "Beyond the Limit"
 Paul Litteral – trumpet
 Arno Hecht – tenor saxophone
 Bob Funk – trombone
 Cookie Watkins – backing vocals on "Buckle Up"
 Judith Spears – backing vocals on "Buckle Up"
 Fonda Rae – backing vocals on "Buckle Up"
 Jay Siegel – backing vocals on "In Love with Love"
 Chris Stein – additional guitar on "In Love with Love", "Free to Fall" and "Rockbird",  bass and drum programming on "In Love with Love", "Rockbird" and "Secret Life"
 Mickey Curry – drums on "You Got Me in Trouble"
 Bill Scheniman – additional percussion and backing vocals

Production
 Seth Justman – producer and arranger
 Chris Stein – additional arrangement "In Love with Love", "Rockbird" and "Secret Life"
 Bill Scheniman – recording, mixing
 Kyle Davis – production coordinator
 Jack Kennedy – assistant sound engineer
 Rick Slater – assistant engineer
 Ken Collins – assistant engineer
 Ken Steiger – assistant engineer
 Jon Goldderger – assistant engineer
 Kent Wagner – assistant engineer
 John Alters – assistant engineer
 David Avidor – assistant engineer
 Michael O'Haro – assistant engineer
 Greg Calbi – sound mastering
 Stephen Sprouse – cover design
 Andy Warhol – background painting
 Paula Greif – art direction
 Guzman (Constance Hansen & Russell Peacock) – photography
 Recorded at Mayfair Recording, Unique Recording, Electric Lady Studios, Sorcerer Sound, Power Station, A & R Recording, AMC Mission Control, Boston Mass.
 Mixed at Counterpoint Studios, NYC

Charts

Certifications

References

1986 albums
Albums produced by Seth Justman
Chrysalis Records albums
Debbie Harry albums
Geffen Records albums